Colotrachelus hestica is a species of small sea snail, a marine gastropod mollusk in the family Pseudococculinidae, the false limpets.

Distribution
This marine species is endemic to New Zealand.

References

 Marshall, B.A. (1986 ["1985"]). Recent and Tertiary Cocculinidae and Pseudococculinidae (Mollusca: Gastropoda) from New Zealand and New South Wales. New Zealand Journal of Zoology. 12(4): 505-546.
 Kano Y., Takano T., Schwabe E. & Warén A. (2016). Phylogenetic position and systematics of the wood-associate limpet genus Caymanabyssia and implications for ecological radiation into deep-sea organic substrates by lepetelloid gastropods. Marine Ecology. 37: 1116-1130

External links
 To USNM Invertebrate Zoology Mollusca Collection
 To World Register of Marine Species

Pseudococculinidae
Gastropods described in 1986
Gastropods of New Zealand